The Marian Anderson House is a historic home located in the Southwest Center City neighborhood of Philadelphia, Pennsylvania. Built circa 1870 in the same neighborhood where opera singer and civil rights advocate Marian Anderson was born 27 years later, this two-story, brick rowhouse dwelling was designed in the Italianate style. Purchased by Anderson in 1924, the same year she became the first African-American concert artist to record spirituals for a major American recording company, she continued to reside here until 1943. The house is currently home to the Marian Anderson Museum and Historical Society.

History and architectural features
The Marian Anderson House was built circa 1870 as a two-story, brick terraced dwelling in the Italianate style. A studio was added above the previously one-story, rear kitchen ell sometime around 1925. The home was then extensively renovated circa 1940. It served as the residence of opera singer and civil rights advocate Marian Anderson from 1924 to 1943.

Placement of this property on the National Register of Historic Places
The nomination materials for placement of the Marian Anderson House on the National Register of Historic Places were reviewed by Pennsylvania's Historic Preservation Board on February 1, 2011, at 9:45 a.m. at the Labor and Industry Building in Harrisburg, Pennsylvania. Also considered for National Register placement at this meeting were: the Robb Farm in Huntingdon County, the McCook Family Estate and the John A. Brashear House and Factory in Pittsburgh, the Montrose Historic District in Susquehanna County, the Quakertown Historic District in Bucks County, Wilpen Hall in Sewickley, Alden Villa in Lebanon County, and the Tindley Temple United Methodist Church in Philadelphia, as well as multiple historic African American churches in Philadelphia that were presented together on a "Multiple Property Documentation Form."

This historic residence was then officially added to the National Register of Historic Places later in 2011.

Marian Anderson Museum and Historical Society 
The property currently houses the Marian Anderson Museum and Historical Society. The organization was founded by Blanche Burton-Lyles. Its current CEO is Jillian Patricia Pirtle.

Flood damage and restoration 
In 2020, pipes burst in the home causing significant damage to both the structure and Anderson memorabilia.

In July 2021, the National Trust for Historic Preservation announced plans to grant the Marian Anderson Museum and Historical Society $75,000 for the purpose of repairing the home's exterior. The Marian Anderson Memorial Fund Task Force, a group that is working to erect a monument to Marian Anderson at the Academy of Music, has stated that it plans to use some of the funds raised to assist with additional repairs to the home.

See also
 Marian Anderson: The Lincoln Memorial Concert
 List of music museums

References

External links
Marian Anderson Historical Society website
"Visions 2018: Touring the Marian Anderson Museum" (video). Philadelphia, Pennsylvania: ABC-6 TV, February 12, 2018.

Historic house museums in Philadelphia
African-American history in Philadelphia
Houses on the National Register of Historic Places in Philadelphia
Italianate architecture in Pennsylvania
Houses completed in 1870
Women's museums in the United States
Anderson, Marion
Music museums in Pennsylvania
Southwest Center City, Philadelphia
African-American historic house museums
Historic house museums in Pennsylvania